Banff Academy is a S1–S6 secondary school in Banff, Aberdeenshire, Scotland. It serves the towns of Banff, Macduff, Whitehills, Portsoy, Aberchirder, Gardenstown, Ordiquhill, Fordyce and surrounding communities.

The school does not teach by means of the Gaelic Language.  All Aberdeenshire Schools are co-educational, providing education for both boys and girls.

In November 2013, an inspection by Education Scotland branded the school as "weak".  However, the school received commendation from Education Scotland the following month, stating that they had made "positive progress" since the school adopted an 80-point improvement plan.

References

External links
 

Secondary schools in Aberdeenshire
Academy